Alipur Noon is a historic village near Bhera in Sargodha District, Punjab, Pakistan. It was settled in the nineteenth century by the Noon family.

People
Alipur Noon is inhabited by over 24,000 people. It is one of the largest villages in the area and is a self-sustained community, having schools, medical clinics, ironmongers, carpenters, and traditional craftsmen in leather arts, clay arts, etc.

Malik Anwar Ali Noon (1924 – 12 September 2014) was a prominent politician from Alipur Noon village. Currently his son Amjad Ali Noon is active in politics from the same village.

Environment
The village is surrounded by citrus, kinno, malta (a variety of orange), lychee, and guava. The date and mango orchards are over a hundred years old. It also has a very successful stud farm.

References

External links
Sargohda history
http://malikamjadalinoon.tripod.com/alipurnoon/

Populated places in Sargodha District